is a Japanese light novel series written by Kō Nigatsu and illustrated by Saba Mizore. It began publication in February 2020 under ASCII Media Works' Dengeki Bunko imprint. As of January 2023, eight volumes have been released. A manga adaptation illustrated by Umemi Makimoto was serialized in ASCII Media Works' seinen manga magazine Dengeki Maoh from March 2020 to July 2021, with its chapters collected into three tankōbon volumes. An anime television series adaptation has been announced.

Characters
 / 

 /

Media

Light novel
Written by Kō Nigatsu and illustrated by Saba Mizore, Seiyū Radio no Ura Omote began its publication on February 7, 2020, under ASCII Media Works' Dengeki Bunko imprint. As of January 2023, eight volumes have been released.

Manga
A manga adaptation illustrated by Umemi Makimoto was serialized in ASCII Media Works' Dengeki Maoh magazine from March 27, 2020, to July 27, 2021. It has been collected into three tankōbon volumes, published from August 2020 to September 2021.

Anime
An anime television series adaptation was announced on December 21, 2022.

Reception
In 2019, Seiyū Radio no Ura Omote won the Grand Prize at the 26th Dengeki Novel Prize. The series ranked 15th in the bunkobon category and eighth in the new work category of the 2021 edition of Takarajimasha's Kono Light Novel ga Sugoi! guide book; it ranked 16th in the bunkobon category of the 2022 edition.

See also
 I Kissed My Girlfriend's Little Sister?!, another light novel series illustrated by Saba Mizore
 Yumemiru Danshi wa Genjitsushugisha, another light novel series illustrated by Saba Mizore
 Heat the Pig Liver, the winner of the gold prize (effectively second place) of the 26th Dengeki Novel Prize

References

External links
  
 

2020 Japanese novels
Anime and manga based on light novels
ASCII Media Works manga
Dengeki Bunko
Dengeki Comics
Light novels
Seinen manga
Upcoming anime television series